The 2021–22 St. Bonaventure Bonnies men's basketball team represented St. Bonaventure University during the 2021–22 NCAA Division I men's basketball season. The Bonnies, led by 15th-year head coach Mark Schmidt, played their home games at the Reilly Center in Olean, New York as members of the Atlantic 10 Conference. They finished the season 23–10, 12–5 in A-10 play to finish in fourth place. They lost in the quarterfinals of the A-10 tournament to Saint Louis. They received an at-large bid to the National Invitation Tournament where they defeated Colorado, Oklahoma, and Virginia to advance to the semifinals. There they lost to Xavier.

The Bonnies were ranked No. 23 in the preseason AP poll, the first time they had ever been ranked in the preseason AP poll.

Previous season
In a season limited due to the ongoing COVID-19 pandemic, the Bonnies finished the 2020–21 season 16–5, 11–4 in A-10 play to win the regular season A-10 championship. They defeated Duquesne, Saint Louis, and VCU to win the A-10 tournament. As a result, they received the conference's automatic bid to the NCAA tournament as the No. 9 seed in the East region. There they lost to LSU in the first round.

Offseason

Coaching changes 
Assistant coach Tray Woodall left the Bonnies to join Fordham's coaching staff on July 21, 2021. On August 6, the school announced it had hired former UMass player and Texas–Rio Grand Valley assistant Chris Lowe to replace Woodall.

Departures

Incoming transfers

Recruiting classes

2021 recruiting class

2022 recruiting class

Preseason

Preseason rankings 
For the first time since 1971, the Bonnies were ranked in the AP Poll when the preseason poll was announced on October 18, 2021. The Bonnies were ranked No. 23 in the poll.

Roster

Schedule and results

|-
!colspan=12 style=| Exhibition

|-
!colspan=12 style=| Non-conference regular season

|-
!colspan=12 style=| A-10 regular season

|-
!colspan=12 style=| A-10 tournament

|-
!colspan=12 style=| NIT tournament

Source

Rankings

*AP does not release post-NCAA Tournament rankings.^Coaches did not release a Week 1 poll.

References

St. Bonaventure Bonnies men's basketball seasons
St. Bonaventure
St. Bonaventure
2021 in sports in New York (state)